The 2015 Bodoland Territorial Council election was held on Wednesday, 8 April 2015 to elect the 3rd council of the Bodoland Territorial Area Districts. All 40 seats in the legislative assembly were set up for election. Bodoland People's Front won the election for the third consecutive term by winning 20 seats and 28.5 percentage of votes. BPF also lost 11 seats in contrast to last election in which they won 31 seats.

Independent candidates won 15 seats, followed by AIUDF winning 4 seats and 1 by the BJP. The INC, which was ruling party of Assam could not able to win even a single seat.

Synopsis
The 2015 elections shows BPF facing stiff competition from various other political parties as contrast to their domination in the last two elections. This time the BJP and AIUDF too fielded their candidates in the elections. The BJP tried hard to gain the ground by conducting a high voltage campaign, but the party had to satisfy itself by winning only one seat out of 40 seats, while AIUDF won 4.

Most of the competition to BPF came from non-Bodo candidates, and the Peoples Coordination for Democratic Rights (PCDR). PCDR,  formed by the All Bodoland Student Union (ABSU), Bodoland Peoples Progressive Front (BPPF)—in collaboration with the Pro-talk National Democratic Front of Bodoland (NDFB), contested the elections as an independent party. PCDR came out of the Bodo community, who claims it as a response to the widespread corruption by the BPF party, and its dictatorship in the governing process. The PCDR, which contested as an independent, had snatched seven seats from the BPF. While the ruling Indian National Congress in Assam could not win even a single seat.

Result

Winning candidates

Members of the Executive Committee (2015-2020 session)

The members of the Executive Committee up to 27 April 2020 were as follows:

See also
2015 elections in India

References

Bodoland
2015 elections in India
Autonomous district council elections in India
Local elections in Assam